Di Asmo, also known as Asma, is a settlement in the foothills of Hajhir, Socotra, Yemen. The name is also given to a nearby ridge.

References 

Populated places in Socotra
Socotra Governorate